The 2016 Canadian Soccer League season (known as the Givova Canadian Soccer League for sponsorship reasons) was the 19th season under the Canadian Soccer League name. The first match of the season was played on May 21, 2016, and ended on October 30, 2016. The season concluded with Serbian White Eagles claiming their second CSL Championship by defeating expansion franchise Hamilton City SC by a score of 2-1. In the Second Division, the York Region Shooters B defeated Toronto Atomic FC B 2-1. During the regular season, York Region claimed their fifth regular-season title and achieved a team milestone by recording their best defensive record allowing only 10 goals a record not matched since the Ottawa Wizards in the 2003 CPSL season. Meanwhile, SC Waterloo acquired their third Second Division regular-season title.

Summary 
York Region Shooters dominated the First division throughout the regular season as they held the top position for the majority of the season. In preparation for the season, York Region retained its core veterans with a notable domestic addition of Nicholas Lindsay, and talent from the Caribbean football market. The Shooters produced an eleven-match undefeated streak that lasted until August 14. They finished the regular season as First Division champions with 18 points above the runners-up. In the postseason York Region was eliminated in the second round to a penalty shootout. 

The second position was a highly coveted spot, which was contested between FC Ukraine United, Scarborough SC, Serbian White Eagles, and Toronto Atomic FC. Ukraine United was an expansion franchise with reputable credentials from the amateur level and was the closest competitor to York Region. United utilized the usage of imports from the Ukrainian football market in their player recruitment. The club made an impressive debut season and finished as the runners up in the division with the highest offensive record. In the playoffs, Ukraine United reached the semifinals. 

The third position was clinched by Scarborough SC by a single point difference. The season cemented the eastern Toronto side as a contender within the division. Former player Ricardo Munguía Pérez was assigned head coach responsibilities and followed the league's standard in importing players. The roster was reliant on imports from the Bulgarian/Balkan football market with a notable domestic acquisition of Canadian international Adrian Cann. The fourth and fifth spots were taken by Serbian White Eagles and Toronto Atomic as only a difference in goal concessions separated the two Toronto clubs. Serbia continued its practice of attracting imports from the Serbian football market, while Atomic continued acquiring talent from Ukraine with a prominent domestic signing of Canadian international Terry Dunfield.       

The remainder of the table was contested between Hamilton City SC, Brantford Galaxy, and Milton SC. After the relocation of London City to Hamilton the organization assembled a mixed roster of domestic veterans and European imports. The Steeltown side finished sixth in the standings and managed to reach the championship final against Serbia. Since the return of Brantford in 2015 the club relied on imports from the Balkans with a notable signing of Krum Bibishkov. The team secured the seventh spot with a two-point difference from Milton, which finished at the bottom of the division.

First Division

Changes from 2015 
The 2016 season featured 14 teams in the two divisions with 8 in the First Division and 6 in the Second Division. The First Division was reduced to eight teams as Brampton United, Burlington SC, and Toronto Croatia departed from the league and became more involved at the developmental level with their academy teams participating in the Canadian Academy of Futbol (CAF). They would also field senior teams in the newly formed CAF Supergroup Open Division. Niagara United departed from the league after a controversial ending in their final match of the 2015 season. A new entry from the Ontario Soccer League known as FC Ukraine United was granted a CSL franchise.

London City's franchise rights were transferred to Hamilton to become Hamilton City SC. London City remained in the league as their territorial rights were kept by Milton owner Jasmin Halkic and relegated to the Second division. SC Waterloo Region was voluntarily relegated to the Second division. The CSL became associated once more with Givova with a sponsor agreement reached, which granted naming rights to the league, and the CSL Championship. The league re-launched its television program as the Givova CSL Primetime with Ethnic Channels Group, and BeIN Sports broadcasting the program. The CSL formed a partnership with the Ontario Youth Soccer Association to establish a youth division for the CSL academy teams. The league also finalized an agreement with the Canadian Corporate Soccer League to assist in developing a similar structure for Toronto's corporate clubs.

Teams

Standings

Season statistics

Goals

Updated: November 25, 2016
Source: http://canadiansoccerleague.ca/2016-first-division-stats/

Hat-tricks

Playoffs

Bracket
Due to a shortage of teams, all eight teams qualified for the one-game quarterfinal, and a one-game semifinal that led to the championship game played on October 30 at Birchmount Stadium in Toronto.

Quarterfinals

Semifinals

CSL Championship

Second Division

Teams 
Of the 10 teams that played in the Second Division in 2015, four returned. The number increased to six with the relegation of SC Waterloo, and London City which served as a reserve team for Milton SC. Hamilton City SC, FC Ukraine United, and Scarborough SC didn't operate a reserve team in the Second Division.

Standings

Top Goal Scorers

Updated: November 26, 2016
Source: http://canadiansoccerleague.ca/2016-second-division-stats/

Playoffs

Quarterfinals

Semifinals

Second Division Championship

References 

Canadian Soccer League (1998–present) seasons
2016 domestic association football leagues
Canadian Soccer League